Lörrach – Müllheim is an electoral constituency (German: Wahlkreis) represented in the Bundestag. It elects one member via first-past-the-post voting. Under the current constituency numbering system, it is designated as constituency 282. It is located in southwestern Baden-Württemberg, comprising the district of Lörrach and southwestern parts of the district of Breisgau-Hochschwarzwald.

Lörrach – Müllheim was created for the inaugural 1949 federal election. Since 2021, it has been represented by Diana Stöcker of the Christian Democratic Union (CDU).

Geography
Lörrach – Müllheim is located in southwestern Baden-Württemberg. As of the 2021 federal election, it comprises the Lörrach district and the municipalities of Auggen, Bad Krozingen, Badenweiler, Ballrechten-Dottingen, Buggingen, Eschbach, Hartheim am Rhein, Heitersheim, Müllheim, Münstertal/Schwarzwald, Neuenburg am Rhein, Staufen im Breisgau, and Sulzburg from the Breisgau-Hochschwarzwald district.

History
Lörrach – Müllheim was created in 1949, then known as Lörrach. It acquired its current name in the 1965 election. In the 1949 election, it was Baden constituency 3 in the numbering system. In the 1953 through 1961 elections, it was number 185. In the 1965 through 1976 elections, it was number 189. In the 1980 through 1998 elections, it was number 186. In the 2002 and 2005 elections, it was number 283. Since the 2009 election, it has been number 282.

Originally, the constituency comprised the districts of Lörrach, Säckingen, and Müllheim. In the 1965 through 1976 elections, it comprised the districts of Lörrach and Müllheim. It acquired its current borders in the 1980 election.

Members
The constituency has been held by Christian Democratic Union (CDU) during all but three Bundestag terms since its creation. It was first represented by Lambert Schill from 1949 to 1957, followed by Herbert Wolff from 1957 to 1961 and Karl August Bühler from 1961 to 1969. Heinz Eyrich was representative from 1969 to 1980, followed by Wilhelm Jung from 1980 to 1990 and Ortrun Schätzle from 1990 to 1998. Marion Caspers-Merk of the Social Democratic Party (SPD) was elected in 1998 and served until 2009. Armin Schuster of the CDU was representative from 2009 to 2021. He was succeeded by party fellow Diana Stöcker in 2021.

Election results

2021 election

2017 election

2013 election

2009 election

Notes

References

Federal electoral districts in Baden-Württemberg
1949 establishments in West Germany
Constituencies established in 1949
Lörrach (district)
Breisgau-Hochschwarzwald